Events from the year 1999 in Jordan.

Incumbents
Monarch: Hussein (until 7 February), Abdullah II (starting 7 February)
Prime Minister: Fayez al-Tarawneh (until 4 March), Abdelraouf al-Rawabdeh (starting 4 March)

Deaths

 7 February - King Hussein.

See also

 Years in Iraq
 Years in Syria
 Years in Saudi Arabia

References

 
1990s in Jordan
Jordan
Jordan
Years of the 20th century in Jordan